Dash Kasan (also Romanized as Dāsh Kasan) is a village in Mahmudabad Rural District, in the Central District of Shahin Dezh County, West Azerbaijan Province, Iran. At the 2006 census, its population was 177, in 38 families.

References 

Populated places in Shahin Dezh County